Josiane Bost (born 7 April 1956, in Tournus, France) is a former French racing cyclist who was world road champion in 1977. She twice won the National Pursuit Championship and once the National Sprint Championship.

Biography
Josiane Bost was one of the best female racing cyclists in France in the 1970s. She won the world championship in 1977 and three national championships on the track, including the unusual combination of pursuit and sprint titles. She and Geneviève Gambillon, her main rival, bridged the gap in French cycling between Lily Herse and Jeannie Longo.

Bost came second three times in the national road championship, beaten each time by Gambillon. She was French pursuit champion in 1977 and 1978 and sprint champion in 1978. In 1977, she beat the American, Connie Carpenter, in the world road championship at San Cristóbal.

Road palmarès
1972

2nd national road championship

1975

2nd national road championship

1976

3rd national road championship

1977

World road championship

2nd national road championship

Track palmarès
National pursuit champion 1977 and 1978 (second in 1975 and 1976)

National sprint champion 1978 (second in 1977 and third in 1976)

Bibliography
Jean Danzé, Louis Bouteculet: De Louis Gauthier à Josiane Bost, cinquante ans de cyclisme montcellin (1998)

1956 births
Living people
French female cyclists
UCI Road World Champions (women)
French track cyclists
People from Tournus
Sportspeople from Saône-et-Loire
Cyclists from Bourgogne-Franche-Comté
20th-century French women